Chlamydomonadales, also known as Volvocales, are an order of flagellated or pseudociliated green algae, specifically of the Chlorophyceae. Chlamydomonadales can form planar or spherical colonies. These vary from Gonium (four to 32 cells) up to Volvox (500 cells or more). Each cell has two flagella, and is similar in appearance to Chlamydomonas, with the flagella throughout the colony moving in coordination.

Both asexual and sexual reproduction occur. In the former, cells divide until they form new colonies, which are then released. In the smaller forms, typically all cells are involved, but larger forms have anterior vegetative and posterior reproductive cells. Sexual reproduction varies from isogamy (both genders produce flagellated gametes of equal size) to oogamy (one gender produces a much larger, nonmotile gamete).

The classification of the Chlamydomonadales varies. Very often they are taken to include the orders Volvocales and Dunallielales, which contain closely related unicellular flagellates, as suborders.  Colony inversion is believed to have arisen twice in this order.  Spheroidal colony formation differs between the two lineages: rotation of daughter protoplasts during successive cell divisions in Astrephomene, and inversion after cell divisions in the Volvocaceae.

Families
, AlgaeBase accepted the following families:
Actinochloridaceae Korshikov
Asteromonadaceae Péterfi
Carteriaceae Pascher
Characiochloridaceae Skuja
Characiosiphonaceae Iyengar
Chlamydomonadaceae F.Stein
Chlorangiellaceae Bourrelly ex Fott
Chlorochytriaceae Setchell & N.L.Gardner
Chlorococcaceae Blackman & Tansley
Chlorosarcinaceae Bourrelly ex Groover & Bold
Dunaliellaceae T.A.Christensen
Goniaceae (Pascher) Pascher
Haematococcaceae G.M.Smith
Hormotilaceae Korshikov
Hypnomonadaceae Korshikov
Palmellaceae Decaisne
Palmellopsidaceae Korshikov
Phacotaceae Francé
Pleurastraceae K.R.Mattox & K.D.Stewart
Protosiphonaceae Blackman & Tansley
Sphaerocystidaceae Fott ex Tsarenko
Sphaerodictyaceae C.-C.Jao
Spondylomoraceae Korshikov
Tetrabaenaceae H.Nozaki & M.Ito
Tetrasporaceae Wittrock
Volvocaceae Ehrenberg
Wislouchiaceae Molinari & Guiry

References

 
Chlorophyta orders
Chlorophyceae